Texas Tower 5 was a planned Texas Tower that was to be located on Brown's Bank,  south of the coast of Nova Scotia in  of water. The 4604th Support Group was supposed to be located at Pease Air Force Base, New Hampshire. The United States Air Force approved the construction of Tower #5 on January 11, 1954, but the tower was never built because of improvements to radar over the area.

References

External links

Cold War military equipment of the United States
Proposed installations of the United States Air Force